The 1924 Colgate football team was an American football team that represented Colgate University as an independent during the 1924 college football season. In its third season under head coach Dick Harlow, the team compiled a 5–4 record and outscored opponents by a total of 218 to 94. Saville Crowther was the team captain. The team played its home games on Whitnall Field in Hamilton, New York.

Schedule

References

Colgate
Colgate Raiders football seasons
Colgate football